Institute for Sex Research may refer to:
 Kinsey Institute, an independent institution associated with Indiana University from 1947 to 2016
Institut für Sexualwissenschaft, a research institution associated with Magnus Hirschfeld in Germany, 1919–1933